The wheelchair curling competition of the 2018 Winter Paralympics was held from 10 to 17 March 2018 at the Gangneung Gymnasium in Gangneung, South Korea. For the first time, twelve mixed teams will compete at the Winter Paralympics.

Medal summary

Medal table

Medalists

Qualification
Qualification for the 2018 Paralympics was based on rankings in the 2015, 2016, and 2017 World Wheelchair Curling Championships. The qualification points are allotted based on the nations' final rankings at the World Championships. The points are distributed as shown in the table below. The eleven countries with the most points were to qualify for the Pyeongchang Games, while the twelfth slot was reserved for the host country, South Korea. Because the South Korean team placed within the top eleven point-scorers, the twelfth slot was given to the twelfth-ranked team, Sweden.

Rankings

Notes
 Scotland, England and Wales all compete separately at the World Wheelchair Curling Championship. Under an agreement between the curling federations of those three home nations, only qualification points earned by Scotland count toward the point total for Great Britain.

Teams
The teams are listed as follows:

Standings

Results
All times are local (UTC+9).

Draw 1
Saturday, 10 March, 14:35

Draw 2
Saturday, 10 March, 19:35

Draw 3
Sunday, 11 March, 9:35

Draw 4
Sunday, 11 March, 14:35

Draw 5
Sunday, 11 March, 19:35

Draw 6
Monday, 12 March, 9:35

Draw 7
Monday, 12 March, 14:35

Draw 8
Monday, 12 March, 19:35

Draw 9
Tuesday, 13 March, 9:35

Draw 10
Tuesday, 13 March, 14:35

Draw 11
Tuesday, 13 March, 19:35

Draw 12
Wednesday, 14 March, 9:35

Draw 13
Wednesday, 14 March, 14:35

Draw 14
Wednesday, 14 March, 19:35

Draw 15
Thursday, 15 March, 9:35

Draw 16
Thursday, 15 March, 14:35

Draw 17
Thursday, 15 March, 19:35

Playoffs

Semifinals
Friday, 16 March, 15:35

Bronze medal game
Saturday, 17 March, 9:35

Gold medal game
Saturday, 17 March, 14:35

References

External links
PyeongChang Official website 
International Paralympic Committee PyeongChang website
Official Results Book – Wheelchair Curling

2018 Paralympic Winter Games - Curlingzone

 
2018
2018 Winter Paralympics events
Winter Paralympics
International curling competitions hosted by South Korea